Badr Mohamed Mirza Bani Al-Hammadi (born 7 January 1984) is an Emirati former racing cyclist.

Major results

2006
 2nd Time trial, National Road Championships
2007
 National Road Championships
2nd Time trial
3rd Road race
 7th Road race, Asian Cycling Championships
2008
 Persian Gulf Road Championships
1st  Road race
1st  Time trial
 1st  Time trial, National Road Championships
 1st H. H. Vice-President's Cup
 1st Prologue, Tour of the AGCC Arab Gulf
2009
 Persian Gulf Road Championships
1st  Road race
1st  Team time trial
2nd  Time trial
 1st  Time trial, National Road Championships
 1st Prologue & Stages 1 & 4 Tour of the AGCC Arab Gulf
2010
 1st President's Cup
2011
 National Road Championships
1st  Road race
2nd Time trial
 1st Overall Prince Faisal bin Fahd International Stage Race
1st Stage 1
2012
 National Road Championships
1st  Road race
2nd Time trial
 3rd  Road race, Persian Gulf Road Championships
2013
 2nd Road race, National Road Championships
2015
 National Road Championships
1st  Time trial
2nd Road race
 1st Stage 2 Tour of the AGCC Arab Gulf
2017
 3rd Time trial, National Road Championships

References

External links

1984 births
Living people
Emirati male cyclists
Place of birth missing (living people)
Cyclists at the 2006 Asian Games
Cyclists at the 2014 Asian Games
Asian Games competitors for the United Arab Emirates